Granatin B is an ellagitannin found in the fruit of Punica granatum (pomegranate). It is a molecule having an enantiomeric dehydrohexahydroxydiphenoyl group.

It is a highly active carbonic anhydrase inhibitor.

References 

Pomegranate ellagitannins
Carbonic anhydrase inhibitors